John Anson (born 1949) was a wrestler.

John Anson may also refer to:
Sir John Anson, 2nd Baronet of the Anson baronets
Sir John Anson, 5th Baronet of the Anson baronets
John W. Anson (1817–1881), British actor

See also

Anson (disambiguation)